Symplocos canescens is a species of plant in the family Symplocaceae. It is endemic to Ecuador.  Its natural habitat is subtropical or tropical moist montane forest.

References

External links
 

Flora of Ecuador
canescens
Vulnerable plants
Taxonomy articles created by Polbot